Harry Harris (2 November 1933 – 9 June 2004) was a Welsh professional footballer.

Harris was born in Magor, Monmouthshire. An inside-forward or wing half, he joined Newport County in 1954 from local club Undy United.

Harris moved to Portsmouth in 1958 making 380 appearances, scoring 48 goals. In 1971, he returned briefly to Newport on loan. In total Harris made 172 appearances for Newport scoring 59 goals.

References

External links 
 

1933 births
2004 deaths
People from Magor, Monmouthshire
Sportspeople from Monmouthshire
Welsh footballers
Association football wing halves
Newport County A.F.C. players
Portsmouth F.C. players
English Football League players
Date of death missing